Narciso Ferreira (1862-1933) was a Portuguese entrepreneur in the north of Portugal (Riba d’Ave, in Vila Nova de Famalição).

Biography 
He was the son of a farmers family. Since his father died when he was very young, his mother gave him a severe education. Seduced by the industrialization in the end of the 19th century, he was only nineteen years old when he set two looms in the farm house where they lived in Pedome. The production was sold in fairs and markets in the north of the country. Afterwards, he made friends with merchants an bankers and soon became very known and respected in the business world.
Around 1887 he buys a groundplot on the edge of the river Ave in Riba d’Ave and he sets the first factory in 1890 with forty looms. In 1894 he establishes a commercial society together with Manuel Joaquim Oliveira, José Augusto Dias (banker), Ortgão de Sampaio (engineer) and José Fernandes, named Sampaio Ferreira & Cia. Lda., with 200 power looms, powered by a weir built on the river. Other factories were built later with the collaboration of his eldest sons, José, Delfim, Alfredo, Joaquim and Raul. He employed approximately 12.000 workers in the region.

Narciso Ferreira and his sons created the Narciso Ferreira Foundation.

Tributes 

 Narciso Ferreira Hospital (1933);
 Theater Narciso Ferreira (1944);
 Narciso Ferreira Foundation (1945);
 Monument to Narciso Ferreira (1949);
 Narciso Ferreira Avenue (Riba de Ave), Narciso Ferreira Alameda (Riba de Ave) etc.

External links
Narciso Ferreira Foundation,  Website 
Vale do Ave, Website
Famalicão ID, Website

References

People from Vila Nova de Famalicão
20th-century Portuguese businesspeople
1862 births
1933 deaths
19th-century Portuguese businesspeople